Pseudobiceros is a genus of flatworms. Like all flatworms, Pseudobiceros are hermaphrodites. This particular genus engages in penis fencing. When the "winner" touches its penis to the "skin" of the other, insemination occurs, and the "loser" has to bear the burden of motherhood.

Species
The following species are recognised in the genus Pseudobiceros:
Pseudobiceros apricus Newman & Cannon, 1994
Pseudobiceros bajae (Hyman, 1953)
Pseudobiceros bedfordi (Laidlaw, 1903)
Pseudobiceros brogani Newman & Cannon, 1997
Pseudobiceros caribbensis Bolanos, Quiroga & Litvaitis, 2007
Pseudobiceros cinereus (Palombi, 1931)
Pseudobiceros damawan Newman & Cannon, 1994
Pseudobiceros dendriticus (Prudhoe, 1989)
Pseudobiceros flavocanthus Newman & Cannon, 1994
Pseudobiceros flavolineatus (Prudhoe, 1989)
Pseudobiceros flowersi Newman & Cannon, 1997
Pseudobiceros fulgor Newman & Cannon, 1994
Pseudobiceros fulvogriseus (Hyman, 1959)
Pseudobiceros gardinieri (Laidlaw, 1902)
Pseudobiceros gloriosus (Newman & Cannon, 1994)
Pseudobiceros gratus (Kato, 1937)
Pseudobiceros hancockanus (Collingwood, 1876)
Pseudobiceros izuensis (Kato, 1944)
Pseudobiceros kryptos Newman & Cannon, 1997
Pseudobiceros mikros Newman & Cannon, 1997
Pseudobiceros miniatus (Schmarda, 1859)
Pseudobiceros murinus Newman & Cannon, 1997
Pseudobiceros nigromarginatus (Yeri & Kaburaki, 1918)
Pseudobiceros pardalis (Verrill, 1900)
Pseudobiceros philippinensis (Kaburaki, 1923)
Pseudobiceros principensis Pérez-García, Herrero-Barrencua, Noreña & Cervera, 2020
Pseudobiceros rubrocinctus (Schmarda, 1859)
Pseudobiceros schmardae Faubel, 1984
Pseudobiceros sharroni Newman & Cannon, 1997
Pseudobiceros splendidus (Lang, 1884)
Pseudobiceros stellae Newman & Cannon, 1994
Pseudobiceros undulatus (Kelaart, 1858)
Pseudobiceros uniarborensis Newman & Cannon, 1994
Pseudobiceros viridis (Kelaart, 1858)
Pseudobiceros wirtzi Bahia & Schroedl, 2016

References

External links
 PBS website with video of Pseudobiceros hancockanus penis-fencing

Turbellaria genera